is a railway station located in the city of Semboku, Akita Prefecture, Japan, operated by the third sector railway operator Akita Nairiku Jūkan Railway.

Lines
Matsuba Station is served by the Nariku Line, and is located 75.0 km from the terminus of the line at Takanosu Station.

Station layout
The station consists of one side platform serving a single bi-directional track. The station is unattended. There is no station building, but only a shelter built on the platform.

Adjacent stations

History
Matsuba Station opened on November 1, 1971, as a station on the Japan National Railways (JNR) Kakunodate Line, serving the town of Nishiki, Akita. The line was station was privatized on November 1, 1986, becoming the Akita Nairiku Railway.

Surrounding area
 
Lake Tazawa

External links

 Nairiku Railway Station information 

Railway stations in Japan opened in 1971
Railway stations in Akita Prefecture
Semboku, Akita